Aviation/LAX station is an elevated light rail station on the C Line of the Los Angeles Metro Rail system. It is located over Aviation Boulevard, after which the station is named, near its intersection with Imperial Highway and just south of Century Freeway in Los Angeles, California.

A free LAX Shuttle bus connects this station to Los Angeles International Airport; however, when the K Line fully opens in 2024, this shuttle will be replaced by the LAX Automated People Mover which will connect with LAX/Metro Transit Center station, and the current Aviation/LAX station will then be renamed Aviation/Imperial station. The original name was Aviation Blvd/I-105 station, but was later simplified and its location close to LAX clarified, with a change to Aviation/LAX.

The train platform, currently suitable for two-car trains, may be lengthened in the future to accommodate three-car trains to enable increased capacity of the line.

Service

Station layout

Hours and frequency

Connections 
, the following connections are available:
Beach Cities Transit: 109
Big Blue Bus (Santa Monica): 3, Rapid 3
Culver City Transit: 6, Rapid 6
GTrans (Gardena): 5
LADOT Commuter Express: 
LAX Shuttle: M (serves Los Angeles International Airport Terminals 1-8 and the Bradley International Terminal via the lower level of World Way)

Notable places nearby 
The station is within walking distance of the following notable places:
 Los Angeles Times Headquarters (in El Segundo)
 Los Angeles County LAX Courthouse (in Del Aire)

References 

C Line (Los Angeles Metro) stations
El Segundo, California
Airport railway stations in the United States
Railway stations in the United States opened in 1995
1995 establishments in California
Los Angeles International Airport